Events from the year 1649 in Denmark.

Incumbents 
 Monarch – Frederick III
 Steward of the Realm – Corfitz Ulfeldt

Events

Births 
 11 April – Princess Frederica Amalia of Denmark, (died 1703 in Germany)

Deaths 
 11 February – Ellen Marsvin, noble, landowner (b. 1572)

References 

 
Denmark
Years of the 17th century in Denmark